The Kraków sausage (Polish: kiełbasa krakowska) is a type of Polish sausage (kielbasa), usually served as a cold cut. The name is the adjective form of the name of the city of Kraków (mediaeval capital of the Polish–Lithuanian Commonwealth till the late 16th century). It is made from cuts of lean pork seasoned with pepper, allspice, coriander and garlic, packed into large casings and smoked.

It is registered under the name "Kiełbasa krakowska sucha staropolska" ("old-Polish dry sausage of Kraków") as a Traditional Speciality Guaranteed product in the European Union and the United Kingdom.

Gallery

See also 

 List of smoked foods
 Rookworst

References 

Polish sausages
Lunch meat
Smoked meat
Polish products with protected designation of origin
Cooked sausages